Thomas Carroll (12 January 1898 – 22 February 1979) was an Irish hurler. Usually lining out at left corner-back or right wing-back, he was a member of the Kilkenny team that won the 1922 All-Ireland Championship.

Carroll began his club career playing with Clonmore in the junior championship. He later enjoyed a lengthy career at senior level with Mooncoin. Carroll won county senior championship medals in 1927, 1932 and in 1936 as captain of the team.

After being selected for the Kilkenny senior team in 1922, he held his position as a back for much of the next decade. He won his first Leinster medal in 1922 before later winning his sole All-Ireland medal after Kilkenny's defeat of Tipperary in the final. Carroll won a further five Leinster medals in 1923, 1925, 1926, 1929 and 1931 and was an All-Ireland runner-up in 1926 and 1931.

Carroll died after a short illness on 22 February 1979.

Honours

Mooncoin
Kilkenny Senior Hurling Championship (3): 1927, 1932, 1936 (c)

Kilkenny
All-Ireland Senior Hurling Championship (1): 1922
Leinster Senior Hurling Championship (6): 1922, 1923, 1925, 1926, 1929, 1931

References

1898 births
1979 deaths
Hurling backs
Mooncoin hurlers
Kilkenny inter-county hurlers
All-Ireland Senior Hurling Championship winners